Sanasi Mahamadou Sy (born 4 April 1999) is a French professional footballer who plays as a left-back for  club Nîmes.

Career
On 6 September 2018, Sy signed his first professional contract with Amiens SC. He made his professional debut for Amiens in a 1–0 Coupe de France win over Valenciennes FC on 5 January 2019. In January 2019, he was loaned to Tubize until the end of the season.

On 19 January 2021, Sy signed with Serie B club Salernitana until 2024.

On 20 August 2021, he went to Cosenza on loan.

On 31 January 2023, Sy returned to France and joined Nîmes.

Personal life
Sy was born in Paris to a Senegalese father and Malian mother.

References

External links

1999 births
Living people
Footballers from Paris
French footballers
French sportspeople of Senegalese descent
French people of Malian descent
Association football fullbacks
Amiens SC players
A.F.C. Tubize players
U.S. Salernitana 1919 players
Cosenza Calcio players
Nîmes Olympique players
Championnat National 3 players
Ligue 1 players
Serie B players
French expatriate footballers
French expatriate sportspeople in Italy
Expatriate footballers in Italy